The CAF Second Round of 2006 FIFA World Cup qualification began on 5 June 2004 and finished on 8 October 2005.

The highest-ranked country in each group at the end of the stage qualified for the 2006 FIFA World Cup. This round also doubled as qualification for the 2006 African Cup of Nations, for which the top three teams from each group qualified.

Format 
The 30 teams (9 teams given a bye directly to the second round and 21 winners from the first round) were split into five groups of six teams each – with all teams playing home and away against each of the other five teams in the group.

The highest-ranked team in each group qualified for the 2006 FIFA World Cup, while the top three teams qualified for the 2006 Africa Cup of Nations (except in Egypt's case; since Egypt qualified for the tournament directly as hosts, fourth-placed Libya qualified in its place.)

Group 1

Ranking

Matches 

Togo's last minute goal, which eliminated Mali from contention, angered the crowd, who proceeded to riot in the streets of Bamako.

(Due to security concerns related to elections, the match was played behind closed doors.)

Group 2

Ranking

Matches

Group 3

Ranking

Matches

Group 4

Ranking

Matches

Group 5

Ranking

Matches 

(Due to unruly behaviour and stampede killing one person in the game against Morocco, this match was played behind closed doors.)

References 

 
2006 FIFA World Cup qualification (CAF)
Qual
Qual
Africa Cup of Nations qualification